The politics of North Rhine-Westphalia takes place within a framework of a federal parliamentary representative democratic republic. The two main parties are the Centre-right Christian Democratic Union and the Centre-left Social Democratic Party of Germany (SPD).

History of politics in North Rhine-Westphalia
From 1966 to 2005, North Rhine-Westphalia was continuously governed by the Social Democrats or SPD-led governments. The 2005 state election granted the CDU an unexpected victory. Their top candidate Jürgen Rüttgers formed a coalition government with the FDP. With the result of the 2010 state elections, this government lost its majority in parliament. After many coalition talks, SPD and the Greens have agreed on a minority government.

Responsibility of the Landtag
The task of legislating is split between the Landtag and the Bundestag. The Bundestag is responsible for all matters which directly affect Germany as a whole. States can only participate in this area through the Bundesrat. The Landtag of North Rhine-Westphalia is responsible for cultural matters, the education system, matters of internal security, i.e. the police, building supervision, health supervision and the media within North Rhine-Westphalia. The Landtag may enact laws as long as the Bundestag does not make use of its right to legislate.

Election system
North Rhine-Westphalia uses a Personalized proportional representation in the Landtag of North Rhine-Westphalia. Every five years the citizens of North Rhine-Westphalia secretly vote in a general election to elect least 181 members of the Landtag. First-past-the-post voting determines 128 of the minimum 181 members of the Landtag. The remaining seats available to each party is determine by the party-list proportional representation. only parties who win at least 5% of the votes cast may be represented in parliament.

Legislation
The Landtag of North Rhine-Westphalia, the parliamentary parties and groups consisting of at least 7 members of parliament have the right to table legal proposals to the Landtag for deliberation. In consultation with the Ältestenrat, the President of the Landtag places the draft bill on the plenary session's agenda. Firstly, the minister responsible, or one of the members who is filing the bill, introduces it to the plenary session and justifies the reasons for introducing it. During this First Reading, if the bill is politically sensitive, there is usually a fundamental debate about the law. Normally, the debate ends with the draft bill being referred to the overall control of the appropriate expert committee and, if necessary, being referred to other committees as well, which may also become involved in the advisory process.

This is when the detailed work begins for the experts in the individual parliamentary parties. External expert witnesses are often brought in to evaluate the legal proposals. They provide statements during what are known as "hearings" and make their contribution to the process of arriving at a decision which is right and proper. Preparations for the expert committees also take place in the parliamentary party working groups. The weekly parliamentary party meetings are a forum for exchanging information between committee members and other Members of Parliament.

The draft bill is examined down to the last detail in a small group, before appearing for a second time on the agenda of the plenary session, when it is debated afresh on the basis of the committee report. Every Member of Parliament now has another opportunity to table amendments. In this Second Reading, once members have decided which tabled amendments to accept, it is usual for the final vote concerning the law to take place.

Constitutional changes and budgetary laws are debated in three Readings. For other proposed legislation, a parliamentary party or a quarter of all members of parliament can apply for there to be a Third Reading and, if necessary, further committee consultations.

The law passed by the Landtag is delivered to the Minister-President, who, together with the ministers involved, is required to sign it and announce it in the Law and Ordinance Gazette. When the law comes into force is normally determined by the legislation itself, most usually the day after its announcement.

The executive branch
Like in every German state, and also on the Federal law, there is a system of parliamentary republic in NRW, which means that the Government - here: the Minister-President - is elected by the Legislature. The Minister-President then appoints the other members of the state government.

For a list of members of the incumbent state government, see Cabinet Laschet. The current government is a coalition between the Christian Democratic Union and the Free Democrats.

Election results
Since the establishment of the Federal Republic of Germany, the ruling Ministers-President and the election results in the state have been:

See also

 Politics of Germany

References